Dracea is a commune in Teleorman County, Muntenia, Romania. It is composed of three villages: Dracea, Florica and Zlata. These were part of Crângu Commune until 2004, when they were split off.

References

Communes in Teleorman County
Localities in Muntenia